Phra Kaew (Thai: พระแก้ว) may refer to:
 Wat Phra Kaew, a Buddhist temple in Bangkok, Thailand
 Wat Phra Kaew, Chiang Rai, a Buddhist temple in Chiang Rai, Thailand
 Haw Phra Kaew, a former Buddhist temple in Vientiane, Laos
 Emerald Buddha, the figurine to which the preceding temples' names refer
 Phra Kaeo railway station, Bangkok